Elokuu ("August" in Finnish) is a Finnish hip hop band founded in 2011 by reggae artist Nopsajalka, Kenyan-Finnish rapper Juno, and producer Jonas W. Karlsson as a mix of Finnish swing and jazz.

Their first official single "Soutaa huopaa" was released on 20 January 2012 with great success. It peaked at number 2 on the Finnish Singles Chart. Elokuu's debut album Hääväki saapuu released by Capitol / EMI Music entered the Finnish Albums Chart at number 2 in its first week of release.

Discography

Albums

Singles

References

External links
Official website

Finnish musical groups
Finnish hip hop groups
2011 establishments in Finland